Wild and Woolly may refer to:
 Wild and Woolly (1917 film), an American silent Western comedy film
 Wild and Woolly (1932 film), a short animated film
 Wild and Woolly (1937 film), an American Western film
 Wild and Wooly, a 1978 comedy/western television film

See also
 Wild & Woolley, an Australian book publisher